In medicine, a pancreatectomy is the surgical removal of all or part of the pancreas. Several types of pancreatectomy exist, including pancreaticoduodenectomy (Whipple procedure), distal pancreatectomy, segmental pancreatectomy, and total pancreatectomy. In recent years, the TP-IAT (Total Pancreatectomy with Islet Autotransplantation) has also gained respectable traction within the medical community. These procedures are used in the management of several conditions involving the pancreas, such as benign pancreatic tumors, pancreatic cancer, and pancreatitis.

Indications
It is performed for a variety of reasons, including:
 Inflammation
 Necrotising pancreatitis
 Chronic pancreatitis with pain
 Trauma
 Neoplasms
 Adenocarcinoma (85%)
 Cystadenoma (mucinous/serous)
 Cystadenocarcinoma
 Islet cell tumors (neuroendocrine tumors)
 Papillary cystic neoplasms
 Lymphoma
 Acinar cell tumors
 Severe hyperinsulinemic hypoglycemia

Types
The most common surgical procedure involving removal of a portion of the pancreas is called a pancreaticoduodenectomy.

Among common consequences of complete or nearly complete pancreatectomy are deficiencies of pancreatic endocrine or exocrine function requiring replacement of insulin or digestive enzymes. The patient immediately develops type 1 diabetes, with little hope for future type 1 diabetes treatments involving the restoration of endocrine function to a damaged pancreas, since the pancreas is either partially or completely absent. Type 1 diabetes can be treated with careful blood glucose monitoring and insulin therapy. Because the pancreas is responsible for the production of many digestive enzymes, a pancreatectomy should only be given as an option for pancreatic disease which is life-threatening, such as pancreatic cancers. It is very important to note that even after a pancreatectomy, pain still exists in most patients. 

A distal pancreatectomy is removal of the body and tail of the pancreas.

Prognosis
After a total pancreatectomy, the body no longer produces its own insulin or pancreatic enzymes, so patients have to take insulin and enzyme supplements. Those who were not already diabetic become so. Glycemic control is challenging even for relatively young and healthy apancreatic people, owing to the digestive challenges of not having endogenous insulin and pancreatic enzymes under autonomic control. It can be insurmountably challenging depending on age and comorbidities. But overall, quality of life in patients after total pancreatectomy is comparable with quality of life in patients who undergo a partial pancreatic resection.

An experimental procedure called islet cell transplantation exists to help mediate the loss of endocrine function following total pancreatectomy.

See also 
 List of surgeries by type

References

External links 
 The Toronto Video Atlas of Liver, Pancreas and Transplant Surgery – Video of total pancreatectomy procedure

Surgical oncology
Surgical removal procedures
Accessory digestive gland surgery
Pancreatic cancer